Armenakan-Democratic Liberal Party was an Armenian political party established in 2009 in Yerevan, Armenia as an offshoot of the Armenian Democratic Liberal Party as a result of an internal rift in the traditional and historic Armenian Democratic Liberal Party (ADL) established in Van in 1885 as Armenakan Party.

The Armenakan-Democratic Liberal Party launched unification talks with Democratic Liberal Party of Armenia on 1 December 2011. On 3 June 2012, the general assembly of the party approved the unification and dissolving of the party into the new unified political party named Democratic Liberal Party (Armenia) (in Armenian Ռամկավար Ազատական Կուսակցություն (Հայաստան) ՌԱԿ (Հայաստան)).

History
The Armenakan-Democratic Liberal Party held its General Constituent Conference on 19 May 2009. The conference elected a running administration presided by Armen Manvelyan as secretary general. The conference also decided to invite to a pan-Armenian convening General Assembly scheduled in Autumn 2009. The assembly had on its agenda the decision on "the relocation of the center of the diaspora ADL to the Republic of Armenia." A special committee was also elected to pursue the registration of the new party with the Justice Ministry of Armenia.

Delegates from both Republic of Armenia and the ADL Armenian diaspora opposition factions held a constituent assembly to form the "Democratic Liberal Party World Council" that elected its 11-member executive committee made up of five members from the diaspora and five from the Republic of Armenia. Hakob Avetikian (Hagop Avedikian in Western Armenian), the editor in chief of Azg was appointed as the general secretary of the party. The head office will be in Yerevan. The first "Democratic Liberal Party World Council" General Assembly was to be held in October 2010.

Disputes with ADL
The position of the Central Committee of the official pan-Diaspora Armenian Democratic Liberal Party (ADL - Ramgavar Party) was unfavourable. The Central Executive of ADL chaired by Mike Kharabian opposed the establishment of the new party. Despite the official position, opposition factions in the party actively sided with the new formation. Very notably, some long-running official Armenian Democratic Liberal Party (ADL) organs have, after the rift in the party and the formation of the rival Armenakan-Democratic Liberal Party, started actively supporting the new formation and in general, represent the policies of the newly formed party. Most notable of these ADL organs are Azg daily published in Yerevan, Armenia in Armenian — recently sold to other independent owners,  the Armenian Mirror-Spectator, published in Watertown, Massachusetts in English  and Abaka published in Montreal, Quebec, Canada in Armenian, English and French). The rest of the official ADL organs still, in general, continued reflecting the line of the earlier ADL party, most notably Zartonk in Beirut, Lebanon, Arev in Cairo, Egypt, Nor Or in  Altadena, California, United States, Sardarabad in Buenos Aires, Argentina and Nor Ashkharh in Athens, Greece. The assembly of the official Armenian Democratic Liberal Party (ADL) took place in the spring of 2009 in Amman, Jordan describing the move as an attempt to weaken the party.

Disputes with ADLA and naming
In Armenia the Democratic Liberal Party of Armenia (ADLA) chaired by Harutiun Arakelian also expressed opposition and blamed the new entity of trying to divide the party. In 2008 three parties in Armenia, the National Rebirth, Dashink, and Liberal Progressive Parties dissolved into the ADLA.

Harutiun Aragelian of the Democratic Liberal Party of Armenia (ADLA) also declared that the party would challenge the adoption of the name of the new party once the latter applies for registration, due to the similarity of the names and ADLA will demand that the new party adopts a different and more distinctive name to alleviate any confusion with the ADLA.

Unification talks
On December 1, 2011, however, Democratic Liberal Party of Armenia signed an agreement with Armenakan-Democratic Liberal Party for launching a unification process between the two parties.

Dissolving of the party
On 3 June 2012, a general assembly was held by Armenakan-Democratic Liberal Party registered members. Merger and union with Democratic Liberal Party of Armenia was approved, followed by the decision to dissolve Armenakan-Democratic Liberal Party, in favor of launching the Democratic Liberal Party (Armenia).

Immediately following that, a joint general constituting assembly was held the same day and union and official declaration of the new party was made. Twenty five members were elected as the party's pan-republican Central Committee with Hakob Avetikyan being elected as the general secretary of the party.

See also

Armenakan Party (Nagorno-Karabakh)
Politics of Armenia
Programs of political parties in Armenia

References

2009 establishments in Armenia
2012 disestablishments in Armenia
Armenian Democratic Liberal Party
Defunct political parties in Armenia
Political parties disestablished in 2012
Political parties established in 2009
Liberal parties in Armenia